The Homestead Act of 1860 in the United States would have made land available for 25 cents per acre. This act was passed by the United States Congress, but was ultimately vetoed by President James Buchanan.

Proponents
This was at a time where Northerners believed that the federal government should give  plots of vacant Western land to pioneers for free. People went to the West to start new lives and wanted cheap land.

Opposition 
There was much concern about the free land idea. Southerners, who were very pro-slavery, worried that this would result in the West becoming populated with free-soilers. This in turn would create many new anti-slavery states, creating an imbalance in the Senate, destroying the South's control. This was the main reason for Buchanan's veto; he consistently did what the South wanted. Another group who opposed this idea was the Eastern industrialists. They feared employees would be drained into the West for free land.

See also
Homestead Act (1862)

References

United States federal public land legislation
1860 in American law
Settlement schemes in the United States
Veto
Bleeding Kansas
James Buchanan
United States proposed federal legislation